Pakistan holidays are celebrated according to the Islamic or local Pakistani calendars for religious and civil purposes, respectively. Religious holidays such as Eid are celebrated according to the Islamic calendar whereas other national holidays such as International Workers' Day, Pakistan Day, and Quaid-i-Azam Day are celebrated according to the Gregorian calendar.

State holidays

Religious holidays

See also 
 List of festivals in Pakistan
 Muslim holidays

References

 
Holidays
Festivals in Pakistan
Pakistan